Boxhill, also called Winkworth, is a Georgian Revival house in Glenview, Kentucky, a small city east of Louisville, Kentucky. It was built in 1906 or 1910 and added to the National Register of Historic Places in 1983.

As with other nearby mansions such as Lincliff, Boxhill reflects a period of Louisville history around the turn of the 20th century where wealthy Louisvillians built showcase homes along the Ohio River above Downtown Louisville. The 29 remaining mansions constitute the largest such collection along the 981-mile long river, and are among the best-preserved collections of turn-of-the-century estates in the United States.

History 
William E. Chess, president of the Chess and Wymond Cooperage Company, built Boxhill on a  tract on the Ohio River that he bought in 1906. The house, located on a bluff above the river, was completed by 1910. The Georgian revival house is reputed to have been designed by Boston architect Joseph E. Chandler. The landscaping, including elaborate gardens and a long tree-lined mall leading from the road to the house, is thought to have been planned by Bryant Fleming, a landscape architect from Buffalo, New York.

Chess' daughter, Mary Grace Chess Robinson, took over the property in 1917.  She and her husband, Avery Robinson, vice-president of a cordage mill, lived on the estate until 1923, when they sold it to Henning Chambers, a brokerage firm executive. Portions of the original estate were sold off during the 1950s. In 1956 sidelights and a cast-iron balcony were added to the house's entry and a second story was added to a wing.

In the early 1970s Robert and Shirley Alexander from Chicago bought the property. In 1977 they were murdered in Boxhill by their stepson. He was diagnosed a schizophrenic and found incompetent to stand trial for the murder. As the mansion had been the site of a grisly double homicide, the bank which came to own it found no buyers despite offering it for sale for over three years. In 1980, Helen Combs, a veteran contractor who had restored dozens of older mansions in Louisville, purchased it for $355,000. She described the restoration process as unique, even for her, saying "The windows were out, plastic was over them, there was no furniture.... We got to this one room and opened the door, and saw big red cabbage roses on the walls, red carpet, red bedspreads and red lamps that glowed."

Combs intended to live in the house but her husband, former Kentucky governor Bert T. Combs, balked at the idea, referring to it as the "murder house". She sold the house in 1982.

See also 
 National Register of Historic Places listings in Jefferson County, Kentucky

References 

Houses in Jefferson County, Kentucky
National Register of Historic Places in Jefferson County, Kentucky
Houses on the National Register of Historic Places in Kentucky
Georgian Revival architecture in Kentucky
1910 establishments in Kentucky
Houses completed in 1910